During the 2007–08 Turkish football season, Fenerbahçe competed in the Süper Lig.

Season summary
Fenerbahçe recorded their best-ever European performance as they reached the Champions League quarter-finals. However, they failed to retain the Süper Lig title. Coach Zico did not sign a contract extension, and resigned on June 10.

Kit
Fenerbahçe's kit was manufactured by German apparel company Adidas and sponsored by Turkish telecommunications company Avea.

First-team squad
Squad at end of season

Left club during season

Süper Lig

Champions League

Third qualifying round

Group stage

Round of 16

Quarter-finals

Notes

References

Fenerbahçe S.K.
Fenerbahçe S.K. (football) seasons